Bertiera is a genus of flowering plants in the family Rubiaceae. It comprises 57 species with most known from tropical Africa, five known from various :Indian Ocean islands and five found in the tropics of the Americas.

Taxonomy
The genus Bertiera was described by Jean Baptiste Christophore Fusée Aublet in 1775 and the type species is Bertiera guianensis. It is the only genus in the tribe Bertiereae.

Species

 Bertiera adamsii (Hepper) N.Hallé
 Bertiera aequatorialis N.Hallé
 Bertiera aethiopica Hiern
 Bertiera angusiana N.Hallé
 Bertiera angustifolia Benth.
 Bertiera annobonensis G.Taylor ex Mildbr.
 Bertiera arctistipula N.Hallé 
 Bertiera batesii Wernham
 Bertiera bicarpellata (K.Schum.) N.Hallé
 Bertiera bistipulata Bojer ex Wernham
 Bertiera borbonica A.Rich. ex DC.
 Bertiera bracteolata Hiern
 Bertiera bracteosa (Donn.Sm.) B.Ståhl & L.Andersson
 Bertiera breviflora Hiern
 Bertiera brevithyrsa A.P.Davis 
 Bertiera chevalieri Hutch. & Dalziel  
 Bertiera congolana De Wild. & T.Durand
 Bertiera crinita (A.Rich.) Wittle & A.P.Davis 
 Bertiera elabensis K.Krause
 Bertiera fimbriata Hepper
 Bertiera globiceps K.Schum.
 Bertiera gonzaleoides Griseb.
 Bertiera guianensis Aubl.
 Bertiera heterophylla Nguembou & Sonké
 Bertiera iturensis K.Krause
 Bertiera lanx N.Hallé
 Bertiera laurentii De Wild.
 Bertiera laxa Benth.
 Bertiera laxissima K.Schum.
 Bertiera ledermannii K.Krause
 Bertiera lejolyana Nguembou & Sonké
 Bertiera letouzeyi N.Hallé
 Bertiera longiloba K.Krause
 Bertiera longithyrsa Baker
 Bertiera loraria N.Hallé
 Bertiera lujae De Wild.
 Bertiera naucleoides (S.Moore) Bridson
 Bertiera orthopetala (Hiern) N.Hallé
 Bertiera parviflora Spruce ex K.Schum.
 Bertiera pauloi Verdc. 
 Bertiera pedicellata (Hiern) Wernham
 Bertiera procumbens K.Schum. & K.Krause
 Bertiera pubiflora (Steyerm.) L.Andersson & B.Ståhl
 Bertiera racemosa (G.Don) K.Schum.
 Bertiera retrofracta K.Schum.
 Bertiera rosseeliana Sonké, Esono & Nguembou
 Bertiera rufa A.Rich. ex DC.
 Bertiera rugosa L.Andersson & C.H.Perss.
 Bertiera sphaerica N.Hallé
 Bertiera spicata (C.F.Gaertn.) K.Schum.
 Bertiera subsessilis Hiern
 Bertiera tessmannii K.Krause
 Bertiera thollonii N.Hallé
 Bertiera thonneri De Wild. & T.Durand
 Bertiera troupinii N.Hallé
 Bertiera viburnoides (Standl.) J.H.Kirkbr.
 Bertiera zaluzania Comm. ex C.F.Gaertn.

References

External links

Bertiera in the World Checklist of Rubiaceae

 
Rubiaceae genera
Taxonomy articles created by Polbot
Taxa named by Jean Baptiste Christian Fusée-Aublet